Vincent Pirès (born 17 November 1995) is a French professional footballer who plays as a midfielder for Championnat National club Sedan.

Club career
On 29 May 2021, Pirès signed with Sedan.

Personal life
Pirès was born in France to a Portuguese father, and an Algerian mother. He holds an Algerian passport, and showed a preference to representing Algeria internationally.

References

Living people
1995 births
Footballers from Paris
French footballers
French people of Portuguese descent
French sportspeople of Algerian descent
Ligue 2 players
Championnat National players
Paris FC players
US Lusitanos Saint-Maur players
Entente SSG players
Louhans-Cuiseaux FC players
CS Sedan Ardennes players
Association football midfielders